This is a list of rivers in Angola. This list is arranged by drainage basin, with respective tributaries indented under each larger stream's name.

Atlantic Ocean
Chiloango River
Congo River
Inkisi River
Kasai River (Cassai River)
Kwango River (Cuango River)
Kwilu River (Cuilo River)
Kwenge River
Wamba River (Uamba River)
Cuilo River
Cambo River
Lui River
Loange River
Lushiko River
Lovua River
Chicapa River
Luachimo River
Chiumbe River
Luia River
Mbridge River
Loge River
Dande River
Bengo River (Zenza River)
Cuanza River
Lucala River
Luando River
Cutato River
Cunhinga River
Longa River
Cuvo River
Quicombo River
Catumbela River
Cuíva River
Cubal River
Coporolo River
Bentiaba River (Rio de São Nicolau)
Bero River
Curoca River
Cunene River
Caculuvar River

Indian Ocean
Zambezi River
Cuando River
Luiana River
Utembo River
Quembo River
Luanginga River (Luio River)
Lungwebungu River (Lungué Bungo River)
Luena River

Okavango Delta
Okavango River (Cubango River)
Cuito River

References
Prentice-Hall, Inc., American World Atlas 1985
United Nations 2008
GEOnet Names Server

Angola
Rivers